Dinitz is a surname. Notable people with the surname include:

Jeff Dinitz (born 1952), American mathematician
Simcha Dinitz (1929–2003), Israeli statesman and politician

See also 
Dinitz blocking flow algorithm, algorithm for network flow, named for Yefim A. Dinitz
Dinitz conjecture, result in discrete mathematics on partial Latin squares, named for Jeff Dinitz
United States v. Dinitz, United States Supreme Court case involving double jeopardy